Tommy P. Beaudreau is an American attorney who has served as the deputy secretary of the Interior since 2021. He served as the first director of the Bureau of Ocean Energy Management from 2011 to 2014 and as chief of staff of the United States Department of the Interior from 2014 until the end of the Obama administration.

Early life and education 
Beaudreau was born in Colorado and raised in the Bear Valley neighborhood of Anchorage, Alaska. He graduated from Service High School. Beaudreau then earned a Bachelor of Arts degree in history from Yale University and a Juris Doctor from the Georgetown University Law Center.

Career 
After graduating from law school, Beaudreau worked as an associate at Fried Frank in Washington, DC. In 2000 and 2001, he was a law clerk for Judge Jerome B. Friedman of the United States District Court for the Eastern District of Virginia. Beaudreau then returned to Fried Frank, where he worked as an associate and later partner. In 2010, he became a senior advisor in the Bureau of Ocean Energy Management Regulation and Enforcement. In 2011, Beaudreau became the first director of the Bureau of Ocean Energy Management. He served until 2014 and was succeeded by Abigail Ross Hopper. From 2014 until the end of the Obama administration, Beaudreau served as chief of staff of the United States Department of the Interior. In January 2017, he became a partner at Latham & Watkins. 

After Elizabeth Klein's nomination for United States Deputy Secretary of the Interior was withdrawn by the Biden administration in March 2021, it was reported that Beaudreau was selected as the nominee. Lisa Murkowski (R, Alaska) helped to convince Biden to nominate Boudreau for assistant secretary instead of Liz Klein. On April 15, 2021, his nomination was sent to the Senate. On May 13, 2021, his nomination was reported out of committee by an 18-1 vote. On June 17, 2021, his nomination was confirmed in the United States Senate by an 88-9 vote. On June 23, 2021, he was sworn into office by Secretary Deb Haaland.

As of 2021 Boudreau has had a reputation for being friendly to oil and gas interests..

References 

Year of birth missing (living people)
Living people
Biden administration personnel
Obama administration personnel
Lawyers from Anchorage, Alaska
Georgetown University Law Center alumni
United States Department of the Interior officials
United States Deputy Secretaries of the Interior
Yale College alumni
21st-century American lawyers